University Ucinf was a Chilean private university specializing in informatics. The UCINF had 7 faculties and  3 Technological Institutes dedicated to the teaching of technical careers.

The UCINF was recognized as the 48th Chilean university according to the classification of the Superior Council of Scientific Research or CSIC, in July 2011, and 25th according to the ranking of El Mercurio.

Faculties and school 

The Main Campus was inaugurated in October 2007

Faculty  of Engineering and Businesses
Faculty  of Legal, Political and Social Sciences
Faculty  of Education
Faculty  of Architecture and Arts

References

External links 
 
 La Ucinf en Rankings de calidad de Chile y el Mundo

Educational institutions established in 1989
For-profit universities and colleges
Private universities in Chile
International universities
Universities in Santiago Metropolitan Region
1989 establishments in Chile